Angelo Bollano Bisio (6 July 1918 – 1978) was an Italian footballer who played in Italy for Sampierdarenese, Liguria, AC Milan, Fiorentina and Spezia, as well as for Marseille in France and Real Murcia in Spain.

External links

 Player profile at Weltfußball.de
 Player profile at La Liga
 Player profile at Olympique Marseille

1918 births
1978 deaths
Italian footballers
Italian expatriate footballers
U.C. Sampdoria players
A.C. Milan players
ACF Fiorentina players
Spezia Calcio players
Olympique de Marseille players
Ligue 1 players
Expatriate footballers in France
Expatriate footballers in Spain
Real Murcia players
La Liga players
Serie A players
Serie B players
Italian expatriate sportspeople in France
Italian expatriate sportspeople in Spain
Association football midfielders
Association football forwards